Summerfield is a census-designated place near Landover in Prince George's County, Maryland. As of the 2020 census, the population was 14,758.  It is a suburb of Washington, D.C.

FedExField is located in Summerfield CDP, as is the Prince George's County Sports and Learning Complex.

Prior to the 2010 Census, the area was not covered by another census-designated place.

Geography
The CDP is bordered to the east by the Capital Beltway (I-495/95) and to the south by Maryland Route 214 (Central Avenue). The CDP of Landover borders Summerfield to the north, the city of Glenarden is to the northeast, Lake Arbor is to the east, Largo is to the southeast, Walker Mill is to the southwest, and Peppermill Village and Seat Pleasant border Summerfield to the west.

Demographics

2020 census

Note: the US Census treats Hispanic/Latino as an ethnic category. This table excludes Latinos from the racial categories and assigns them to a separate category. Hispanics/Latinos can be of any race.

Education
Summerfield's public schools are managed by Prince George's County Public Schools.

Zoned elementary schools include Highland Park, William Paca, and Cora L. Rice. Zoned middle schools include G. James Gholson and Kenmoor. Zoned high schools include Central High School, Fairmont Heights High School, and Charles Herbert Flowers High School.

John Carroll Elementary School was previously located in what is now Summerfield CDP. It was scheduled to close in 2009.

Transportation
Washington Metro operates the Morgan Boulevard station in Summerfield CDP.

Raljon

Raljon was the name of area around FedExField, home of the Washington Redskins (the current Washington Commanders). Former team owner Jack Kent Cooke derived the name from the names of his sons, Ralph and John. Introduced in 1997, the name enjoyed almost no currency beyond the team, NFL press releases, television and radio partners, and the U.S. Postal Service, which granted Cooke's request that the area be officially recognized. Tony Kornheiser, in a column criticizing the name, wrote, "Lucky for us, Cooke didn't name his kids Peter and Ennis (penis)." Daniel Snyder discontinued the use of the name when he bought the franchise in 1999.

References

External links
Washington Redskins, from Sports Encyclopedia
Stadium Guide, from Washington Redskins site

Census-designated places in Prince George's County, Maryland
Census-designated places in Maryland